Cayden Browning Wallace (born August 7, 2001) is an American professional baseball third baseman in the Kansas City Royals organization.

Amateur career
Wallace attended Greenbrier High School in Greenbrier, Arkansas. As a freshman in 2017, he hit .349 with four home runs before batting .481 with 11 home runs as a sophomore in 2018. As a junior in 2019, he batted .514 with six home runs and 22 RBIs. That summer, he played in the Under Armour All-America Baseball Game at Wrigley Field. His senior season in 2020 was cancelled after eight games due to the COVID-19 pandemic, but he was still named the Gatorade Baseball Player of the Year for the state of Arkansas. He went unselected in the 2020 Major League Baseball draft and enrolled at the University of Arkansas to play college baseball.

In 2021, as a freshman at Arkansas, Wallace started sixty games (mainly in right field) in which he slashed .279/.369/.500 with 14 home runs, 44 RBIs, 11 doubles, and a team-leading 67 hits. His 14 home runs were second on the team behind Robert Moore and also tied the freshman home run record set by Heston Kjerstad. He was named a Freshman All-American, making him the 24th Razorback to earn the honors. After the 2021 season, he played collegiate summer baseball for the Bourne Braves of the Cape Cod Baseball League. For the 2022 season, Wallace moved to third base. He was named the Southeastern Conference (SEC) Player of the Week on March 15 after he hit three home runs (two grand slams) and had 13 RBIs over a weekend series. Over 65 games, he batted .297 with 16 home runs, sixty RBIs, and 19 doubles, and ended the season as a top-40 prospect for the upcoming draft.

Professional career
Wallace was selected by the Kansas City Royals in the second round with the 49th overall selection of the 2022 Major League Baseball draft. He signed with the team for $1.70 million.

Wallace made his professional debut with the Rookie-level Arizona Complex League Royals and was promoted to the Columbia Fireflies of the Single-A Carolina League after three games. Over thirty games, he batted .297 with two home runs, 17 RBIs, and eight doubles.

Personal life
Wallace's older brother, Paxton, played college baseball at Wichita State University and currently plays in the Royals organization. Their father, Mike, played college football at the University of Central Arkansas.

References

External links
Arkansas Razorbacks bio

2001 births
Living people
Baseball players from Arkansas
Baseball third basemen
Arkansas Razorbacks baseball players
Bourne Braves players
Arizona Complex League Royals players